The 1964–65 WHL season was the 13th season of the Western Hockey League. The Portland Buckaroos were the President's Cup champions as they beat the Victoria Maple Leafs in five games in the final series.

Final Standings 

bold - qualified for playoffs

Playoffs 

The Portland Buckaroos win the President's Cup 4 games to 1.

References 

Western Hockey League (1952–1974) seasons
1964–65 in American ice hockey by league
1964–65 in Canadian ice hockey by league